Oberndorf am Neckar (Swabian: Oberndorf am Näggô) is a town in the district of Rottweil, in Baden-Württemberg, Germany. It historically was and currently is a major center of the German weapons industry.

Geography
Oberndorf lies in the Neckar Valley, which is between the Black Forest and the Swabian Jura. The Autobahn A 81 is nearby, with the Oberndorf exit about halfway between Stuttgart and Konstanz. The train line Stuttgart-Zürich-Milan goes directly through Oberndorf as well.

Neighborhoods
The city of Oberndorf am Neckar is made up of the city proper and the surrounding villages of Altoberndorf, Aistaig, Boll, Bochingen, Beffendorf and Hochmössingen. The formerly independent surrounding villages were put under the administration of Oberndorf during the village and township reforms of Baden-Württemberg in the early 1970s.

Culture and sightseeing
Aside from the beautiful Black Forest and wonderful German countryside, Oberndorf offers much to see. It is well known for its annual Karneval celebrations, which remain very traditional. An old historical "freier Markt".

Museums
 Home Museum 
 Weapons Museum

Notable company headquarters
 Bippus
 Heckler & Koch
 Mafell
 Mauser
 Schwarzwälder Bote
 Feinwerkbau - Westinger & Altenburger

Twin towns – sister cities

Oberndorf am Neckar is twinned with:
 Oberndorf bei Salzburg, Austria
 Thierville-sur-Meuse, France

Notable people
Wilhelm Mauser (1834–1882), businessman and firearm manufacturer
Paul Mauser (1838–1914), businessman and firearm manufacturer
Steffen Weigold (born 1979), cyclist

References

External links
 Official Website 
 Official Website of Hochmössingen  
 Oberndorf in World War II 

Rottweil (district)
Populated places on the Neckar basin
Populated riverside places in Germany
Württemberg